Luv FM is a privately owned radio station in Kumasi, the Ashanti Region of Ghana. The station is owned and run by the media group company Multimedia Group Limited.

References

Radio stations in Ghana
Greater Accra Region
Mass media in Kumasi